Slow Pain was an American West Coast hip hop recording artist. He was a former member of chicano rap groups Street Mentality and G'Fellas. In 1994, he released his debut solo studio album called The Baby O.G. through Thump Records with the hit single "Money Maid". Slow Pain died on September 3, 2020. Millions of fans enjoyed his music.

Discography

Solo albums 
 1995 – The Baby O.G. (Thump Records)
 2001 – Lil' Don Juan (Showtime Hydraulics Entertainment)
 2003 – Raider 4 Life (Thump Records)
 2008 – The OG (Silent Giant Entertainment)

Street albums 
 2001 – Slow Pain Presents Old Town Gangsters
 2002 – Slow Pain Presents Old Town Mafia: This Is 4 My Raza
 2002 – Slow Pain Presents Old Town Gangsters 2: Hood Patrol
 2004 – Slow Pain Presents Old Town Radio: 113.1 FM
 2004 – Slow Pain Presents Old Town Gangsters 3: L.A. Blues
 2005 – In The Hood 
 2007 – The Cali King
 2007 – Slow Pain Presents Old Town Gangsters: Game Over
 2008 – Slow Pain Presents Old Town Radio, Vol. 2

Collaborative albums 
 1992 – The Town I Live In (with Lil-V & Bandit, as Street Mentality)
 1999 – Crime Stories (with Nino Brown & A.L.T., as G'Fellas)
 2000 – G's Of The Industry (with Nino Brown)
 2001 – Gangster 4 Life (with Nino Brown & A.L.T., as G'Fellas) - #67 on the Top R&B/Hip-Hop Albums
 2006 – Slow Pain Presents Old Town Mafia: The Saga Continues (with Lil Minor, Sniper & Bigg Bandit)

Compilation albums 
 2000 – The Hit List
 2004 – La Raza Knockout Hits (with Nino Brown)

Singles 
 1995 - "Saturday Night Ballin'"
 1995 - "Bump Dat Ass" (featuring Kid Frost, A.L.T., JV & Rocky Padilla) 
 1996 - "Ride Wit Me"
 1996 - "Slow Pain Baby (To the Left, To the Right)"
 1996 - "Money Maid"
 1999 - "Hustling Ain't Dead" (featuring Don Cisco)
 2001 - "Dreamin' On Chrome" (featuring Nino Brown)
 2004 - "Insane" / "South Sidin"
 2004 - "Pimp It" / "Brown Love"

Guest appearances 
1998:

 N2Deep – "Where the G's At" (feat. Baby Bash, Kid Frost, Don Cisco, O.G.Enius & Nino Brown) from The Rumble
 Litefoot – "Watcha Wanna Do" (feat. A.L.T.) and "NDN Goddess" from The Life & Times

2000:

 Steelo – "All Night Long" from Take It to the Next and Held Up: Original Motion Picture Soundtrack
 Kid Frost – "Celeb Ent" (feat. Nino Brown) from That Was Then, This Is Now, Vol. II

2002:

 Kid Frost – "Nu Bitch Nu Twist" (feat. A.L.T., Don Cisco, K-Borne & Nino Brown) from Still Up in This Shit!

2005:

 Nino Brown – "Love U Down" from Nino Brown

2009:

 A.L.T. – "Bang Bang" from The Resurrection

See also
List of Chicano rappers

References

External links
 
Slow Pain at Discogs

}

Living people
Year of birth missing (living people)
21st-century American rappers
American rappers of Mexican descent
Chicano rap
Gangsta rappers
G-funk artists
Hispanic and Latino American rappers
Rappers from California
West Coast hip hop musicians